Double Trouble Live is a double LP live album by American rock group Molly Hatchet, released in 1985. Two previously unreleased songs, "Walk on the Side of the Angels" and "Walk with You" were omitted in the CD edition to fit all the music on a single compact disc. The cover of "Freebird" and "Edge of Sundown" were songs usually performed by lead singer Danny Joe Brown and The Danny Joe Brown Band during his period of absence from Molly Hatchet.

Track listing
Side one
"Whiskey Man" (Danny Joe Brown, Bruce Crump, Dave Hlubek, Steve Holland) - 3:47
"Bounty Hunter" (Brown, Hlubek, Duane Roland) - 3:00
"Gator Country" (Hlubek, Holland, Banner Thomas) - 7:16
"Flirtin' with Disaster" (Brown, Hlubek, Thomas) - 5:30

Side two
"Stone in Your Heart" (Roland Brooks, Thomas DeLuca, Harold Tipton) - 4:13
"Satisfied Man" (DeLuca, Tom Jans) - 4:43
"Bloody Reunion" (Jimmy Farrar, Hlubek, Roland, Thomas) - 4:04
"Boogie No More" (Brown, Crump, Hlubek, Holland, Roland, Thomas) - 7:36

Side three
"Freebird" (Allen Collins, Ronnie Van Zant) - 11:19 (Lynyrd Skynyrd cover)
"Walk on the Side of the Angels" (Marc Blatte, Larry Gottlieb) - 3:56
"Walk with You" (John Hall) - 4:26 (John Hall cover)

Side four
"Dreams I'll Never See" (Gregg Allman) - 7:02 (The Allman Brothers Band cover)
"Edge of Sundown" (Brown, David Bush, Kenny McVay) - 4:24 (The Danny Joe Brown Band cover)
"Fall of the Peacemakers" (Hlubek) - 7:11
"Beatin' the Odds" (Hlubek, Roland, Thomas) - 3:41

Personnel
Molly Hatchet
Danny Joe Brown - lead vocals, guitar, harmonica
Dave Hlubek - guitar, slide guitar, backing vocals
Duane Roland - guitar
John Galvin - keyboards, backing vocals
Riff West - bass, backing vocals
Bruce Crump - drums

Additional musicians
Dru Lombar - guitar on "Walk on the Side of the Angels"
Keith Holmes - saxophone on "Walk with You"

Production
Pat Armstrong - producer
Andy de Ganahl - producer, live recording in Jacksonville, mixing assistant 
Johnny Rosen - live recording in Dallas and Jacksonville
Greg McNeilly - assistant engineer in Jacksonville
Ed Thacker - mixing at Parc Studios, Orlando, Florida
George Marino - mastering at Sterling Sound, New York

Charts

References

Molly Hatchet albums
1985 live albums
Epic Records live albums